Final X is an annual series of wrestling events that determine the US Senior World/Olympic Team Members at each weight class.

History 
Final X was founded on January 16, 2018, after FloSports and USA Wrestling partnered and launched the series. The first event took place at Lincoln, Nebraska on June 8, 2018, and since then the events have been aired on FloWrestling.

In the events of 2018, there were only two disciplines; freestyle and women's freestyle. In 2019, Greco-Roman was also featured, presenting all of the three Olympic disciplines.

Overview 
Final X events are separated into two different formats:

 Regular events: Events that provide full cards and go as planned.
 Wrestle-offs events: Events that provide only one match that had inconveniences in the past.

Function 
Before 2018, the US World Team (one American wrestler per weight class competes at the World Championships) was defined in an event simply called "US World Team Trials". Since 2018, Final X has consisted on a best-of-three series that determines the representative of the United States at the World Championships.

Events

References

Amateur wrestling
Wrestling
Freestyle wrestling
Annual sporting events in the United States
Recurring sporting events established in 2018
Sports in Lincoln, Nebraska
Sports in Nebraska
Sports in New Jersey
Sports in State College, Pennsylvania
Sports in Pennsylvania
Sports in Bethlehem, Pennsylvania
Sports in Allen, Texas
Sports in Texas